Tom Curtis Shapiro (born in Kansas City, Missouri) is an American songwriter and occasional record producer, known primarily for his work in country music. To date, he holds four Country Songwriter of the Year awards from Broadcast Music Incorporated, as well as the Songwriter of the Decade award from the Nashville Songwriters Association International. He has also written more than fifty Top Ten hits, including twenty-six Number Ones.

Musical career
Since the 1970s, Shapiro has been a prominent songwriter, doing most of his work in country music. His first big hit was the international smash, "Never Give Up On a Good Thing" by George Benson which was a top five record
in 13 countries. He signed to a publishing contract with Tree International in the 1980s, with Eddy Raven, Crystal Gayle, Marie Osmond and Lee Greenwood being among the first country acts to cut his material. In 1978 The Shadows released their cover of his song "Love Deluxe."  His career continued throughout the 1990s and into the 2000s, with several of his cuts having topped the Billboard Hot Country Songs charts. Among these Number One hits are "Wink" by Neal McCoy, which received BMI's Robert J. Burton award for being the most performed country song of 1994; "No Place That Far" by Sara Evans; "I Miss My Friend" by Darryl Worley (both of which were their respective artists' first Number Ones); and "Ain't Nothing 'Bout You" by Brooks & Dunn, which was named by Billboard as the Number one country song of 2001.
In 2008, Shapiro was inducted into the Nashville Songwriter's Hall of Fame.
As of 2013, Shapiro has had 57 Top 10 hits, including 26 number ones.

In addition, Shapiro has produced albums for Billy Dean and Dusty Springfield, as well as writing several singles for the former.

References

American country songwriters
American male songwriters
Living people
Musicians from Kansas City, Missouri
Year of birth missing (living people)
Songwriters from Missouri